Bluewing is an unincorporated community in Cannon County, Tennessee, United States. Tennessee State Route 146 also passes through the southern edge of the community.

References

Unincorporated communities in Cannon County, Tennessee
Unincorporated communities in Tennessee